Isabel Barreto de Castro (Pontevedra, Galicia, Spain), (1567 – 1612) was a Spanish sailor and traveler,  the first known woman to hold the office of admiral in the history of navigation. She was purportedly the  granddaughter of Francisco Barreto, governor of Portuguese India.  Isabel Barreto married Alvaro de Mendaña, Spanish navigator, patron of several expeditions to the Pacific Ocean, and European discoverer of the Solomon Islands and the Marquesas Islands.

Life
Isabel accompanied her spouse on his last expedition from Peru to the Pacific. In the Santa Cruz Islands, she replaced Mendaña and her brother, Lorenzo Barreto, as Adelantada and Governor after their death. She and the main pilot Pedro Fernández de Quirós arrived at Manila, in the Philippines, with the 100 survivors of the expedition in the only remaining ship (at the beginning 378 men and women in four ships), after a terrible voyage of twelve weeks from the settlement of Santa Cruz (Nendö).

Doña Isabel was honoured in Manila, and Quirós was commended for his service; with both absolved of any responsibility for the results of the expedition. Isabel, accused of cruelty by the crew, demonstrated a strong personality with great leadership and great determination. She had an uncompromising attitude and managed to maintain severe discipline of the crew of tough and adventurous men, always willing to conspire and mutiny.

She remarried to general Fernando de Castro, again crossing the Pacific Ocean to Mexico, and then settled in Buenos Aires, where they lived for several years, before returning to Peru.

It is said that Isabel crossed the Atlantic Ocean for the last time to Spain to defend her rights over the Solomon Islands, because the King had granted  the right to colonize the islands to Pedro Fernández de Quirós. She may be buried in Castrovirreyna (Peru) or in Galicia (Spain), in 1612.

Route
Route of Mendaña/Barreto/Quirós 1595 expedition:

El Callao, April 9, 1595.
Paita (Perú), June 16.
Las Marquesas de Mendoza (Marquesas Islands), July 21 – August 5. 
Magdalena (Fatu Hiva) 
Dominica (Hiva Oa) 
Santa Cristina (Tahuata) 
San Pedro (Moho Tani) 
San Bernardo (Pukapuka, Cook Islands), August 20. 
La Solitaria (Niulakita, Tuvalu), August 29. 
Solomon Islands: 
Tinakula, September 7. 
La Huerta (Tomotu Noi), Recifes (Swallow Islands), September 8. 
Santa Cruz (Nendö, Santa Cruz Islands), September 8 to November 18. They attempted to found a colony, where Álvaro de Mendaña died, October 18. 
Guam, January 1, 1596. 
Manila, February 11.

In modern literature
The voyage's story is told in The Islands of Unwisdom, an historic novel by Robert Graves.

References 

 Maura, Juan Francisco. Españolas de ultramar. Valencia: Universidad de Valencia, 2005
 Revistas Voluntarios «La primera mujer Almirante de Marina en España» Consultado el 22 de mayo de 2012
 Euskalnet «Bustamante – Casa de Quijas y su rama del Perú» Consultado el 22 de mayo de 2012
 B. Vega, Carlos. Conquistadoras. McFarland, 2003. , p. 168
 Finisterrae «ISABEL BARRETO, PRIMERA ALMIRANTE DE LA MARINA» Consultado el 22 de mayo de 2012
 González López, Emilio. Siempre de negro: Galicia en la Contrarreforma, el reinado de Felipe II. Editorial Galaxia, 1970, p. 223
 Diccionario enciclopédico Salvat. Volumen II. Edición impresa.
 Biografías.com «Barreto, Isabel (ca. 1567-ca. 1610).» Consultado el 22 de mayo de 2012
 ArteHistoria «DESCUBRIMIENTO DE LAS REGIONES AUSTRALES » Consultado el 22 de mayo de 2012
 Armada «Instituto de Historia y Cultura Naval. X. Islas Marquesas y de Santa Cruz.» Consultado el 22 de mayo de 2012

1567 births
1612 deaths
Spanish admirals
History of the Marquesas Islands
History of the Solomon Islands
History of Tuvalu
Female admirals
Spanish people of Portuguese descent
Spanish explorers of the Pacific